Elkhorn National Forest was established as the Elkhorn Forest Reserve in Montana on May 12, 1905, with . It became a National Forest on March 4, 1907. On July 1, 1908, it was combined with Helena National Forest and the name was discontinued.

See also
 List of forests in Montana

References

External links
Forest History Society
Forest History Society:Listing of the National Forests of the United States Text from Davis, Richard C., ed. Encyclopedia of American Forest and Conservation History. New York: Macmillan Publishing Company for the Forest History Society, 1983. Vol. II, pp. 743-788.

Former National Forests of Montana
1905 establishments in Montana